Adem Kapič (born 16 April 1975) is a retired football midfielder.

During his club career, Kapič notably played for MSV Duisburg, Alemannia Aachen, Ferencvárosi TC and Beitar Jerusalem. He also made six appearances for the Slovenia national team.

References

External links
 

1975 births
Living people
Slovenian people of Bosnia and Herzegovina descent
Slovenian footballers
Slovenia international footballers
Association football midfielders
ND Gorica players
NK Olimpija Ljubljana (1945–2005) players
NK Ljubljana players
Slovenian expatriate footballers
MSV Duisburg players
Alemannia Aachen players
Stuttgarter Kickers players
Expatriate footballers in Hungary
Slovenian PrvaLiga players
Ferencvárosi TC footballers
Slovenian expatriate sportspeople in Hungary
Beitar Jerusalem F.C. players
Footballers from Ljubljana
Vasas SC players
Lombard-Pápa TFC footballers
Bundesliga players
2. Bundesliga players